Wiang Subdistrict is the name of the following tambon (subdistricts) in Thailand:

 Wiang Subdistrict, Fang District, in Chiang Mai Province
 Wiang Subdistrict, Phrao District, in Chiang Mai Province
 Wiang Subdistrict, Mueang Chiang Rai District, in Chiang Rai Province
 Wiang Subdistrict, Chiang Saen District, in Chiang Rai Province
 Wiang Subdistrict in Chiang Khong District, Chiang Rai Province
 Wiang Subdistrict in Thoeng District, Chiang Rai Province
 Wiang Subdistrict in Wiang Pa Pao District, Chiang Rai Province
 Wiang Subdistrict in Mueang Phayao District, Phayao Province
 Wiang Subdistrict in Chiang Kham District, Phayao Province
 Wiang Subdistrict in Chaiya District, Surat Thani Province

See also
 Wiang (disambiguation)